Konstantin Veniaminovich Gey (1896 – February 25, 1939) was a Russian Communist Party functionary of Estonian origin, a participant in the Russian Revolution of 1917 and Soviet politician.

A member of the Bolshevik Party since 1916, Gey was instrumental in securing Soviet control in the city of Pskov.

Gey was born in St. Petersburg in 1896. He was a candidate member of the Bolshevik Central Committee from 1924 until 1934 and was the First Secretary of the Central Committee of the Communist Party of Byelorussia from 1930 until 1932.

Gey was demoted from the Central Committee in 1934. During the final months of the Great Purge, he was arrested in 1938 and executed by shooting in 1939. He was posthumously rehabilitated in 1956.

A street in Pskov bears Gey's name.

References

External links
  Biography

1896 births
1939 deaths
Politicians from Saint Petersburg
People from Saint Petersburg Governorate
Russian Social Democratic Labour Party members
Old Bolsheviks
Central Committee of the Communist Party of the Soviet Union candidate members
Heads of the Communist Party of Byelorussia
Great Purge victims from Russia
Deaths by firearm in Russia
Executed politicians
Soviet rehabilitations